Cameroon Airlines Flight 3701 was an air accident that occurred on 3 December 1995.  The Boeing 737-200, registration TJ-CBE, crashed after it lost control near Douala, Cameroon.  On its second approach to Douala International Airport power was lost to one engine. The accident killed 71 passengers and crew and five people were injured but survived.

Accident
Cameroon Airlines Flight 3701 took off from Cadjehoun Airport in Cotonou, Benin, on a flight to Douala International Airport. The Boeing 737-200 had 71 passengers and five crew on board and after a one-hour flight was ready to land at Douala International Airport, but as the landing gear was lowered the nose gear light showed that it was not down. The pilots called air traffic control saying that they had landing gear problems and the crew elected to abort the approach. Some minutes later they tried a second approach but the pilots did not see that the engine two was operating at high power while the No. 1 engine was not developing power. Then the aircraft went into a steep dive and crashed  short of the runway in a mangrove swamp. The aircraft burst into flames, killing 71 passengers and crew. Five people survived the accident.

Cause
The accident report determined the cause of the loss of control and the loss of power to engine No. 1 to be the following:
The probable cause of the accident is a loss of control during a go-around attempt made during a maneuver to reach the runway with degraded performance
Seriously contributing to this:
 The detachment by structural fatigue of a first stage compressor blade of the No. 1 engine which resulted in a loss of power and destabilization of the trajectory when landing
 The late or slow execution of the go-around procedure with an unidentified single-engine configuration, leading to irreversible loss of speed.

— Accident report

References

1995 in Cameroon
Aviation accidents and incidents in 1995
Accidents and incidents involving the Boeing 737 Original
Aviation accidents and incidents in Cameroon
Cameroon Airlines accidents and incidents
December 1995 events in Africa
1995 disasters in Cameroon